Benjamin Sadler (born Benjamin Klimaschewski; 12 February 1971) is a German actor.

Biography 
Sadler was born in Toronto, Canada, the son of a German graphic designer and a British teacher. He lived in Canada until he was five. In 1976 he moved with his parents to Germany.
After studying at the Royal Academy of Dramatic Art in London, his career as actor started in 1994 with roles in German thrillers such as Wolffs Revier and SK-Babies. In 2001 he appeared in the German-Italian film Maria Magdalena in the role as John the Baptist beside Maria Grazia Cucinotta and Danny Quinn. In 2002 he worked on two further religious films: The Bible – The Apocalypse with Richard Harris and Luther with Joseph Fiennes and Sir Peter Ustinov. He also appeared as the young emperor Augustus (Peter O'Toole was the emperor in later life).

In 2006 he played the part of a physician in the film Dresden. In 2007 he starred as a lawyer and father of a thalidomide-disabled daughter, for which he received a Bambi Award in 2007. He explained in an interview that he was proud to be a part of the film, which influenced the German parliament to pass a law giving greater financial compensation for victims of thalidomide.

Filmography 

1996-2019: Tatort – Mord in der ersten Liga (TV Series) – Jan Liebermann / Dr. Christian Mertens / Gert Mewes
1998: Spuk aus der Gruft ("Spook from the Grave" – adaptation of one of a trilogy of books) – Friedrich von Kuhlbanz
1998: Rosenzweigs Freiheit – Jacob Rosenzweig
2000: Spuk im Reich der Schatten ("Spook in the Kingdom of Shadows" – adaptation of one of a trilogy of books) (TV Movie) – Friedrich
2000:  (TV Movie) – John the Baptist
2000: The Apocalypse (TV Movie) – Valerius
2001: Antonia – Zwischen Liebe und Macht ("Antonia – Love and Power") (TV Movie) – Moritz Ahrendorff
2001: Jonathans Liebe ("Jonathan's Love") (TV Movie) – Jonathan
2003: Luther – George Spalatin
2003: Nur Anfänger heiraten ("Only Beginners Marry") (TV Movie) – Hannes Mack
2003: Imperium: Augustus (TV Movie) – Gaius Octavius / Young Augustus
2003: Spuk am Tor der Zeit ("Spook at the Gate of Time" – adaptation of one of a trilogy of books)
2004: Italiener und andere Süßigkeiten ("Italians and Other Sweet Things") (TV Movie) – Paolo Fabrelli
2004: Sehnsucht nach Liebe ("Waiting for Love") (TV Movie) – Jochen Hofmann
2006: Dresden (TV Movie) – Alexander Wenninger
2007: Caravaggio (TV Movie) – Onorio Longhi
2007: Hotel Meina – Hans Krassler
2007: War and Peace (TV Mini-Series) – Dolokhov
2007: Contergan (TV Movie) – Paul Wegener
2008:  (TV Movie) – Eik Meiers
2009: Impact (TV Mini-Series) – Roland Emerson
2009:  (TV Mini-Series) – Alfried Krupp
2009: Auftrag Schutzengel ("Operation Guardian Angel") (TV Movie) – Ben Sievert
2009: Within the Whirlwind – Pavel
2010: Liebe deinen Feind (TV Movie) – Captain Simon
2010: Mörderischer Besuch (TV Movie) – Theo von Gelden
2010: Paura d'amare (TV Series) – Carlo
2011: If Not Us, Who? – Walter Jens
2011: Rosa Roth (TV Series) – Fuhrmann
2011:  (TV Movie) – Hans Hass
2012:  (TV Movie) – Ulrich Wegener
2012: Passion – Prosecutor
2012: The German Friend – Michael Tendler
2012: Rommel (TV Movie) – General Speidel
2012:  – Frank Henne
2013: Der Tote im Eis (TV Movie) – Gregor Lucius
2013: Killing All the Flies (TV Movie) – Vincent Reid
2013: Anna Karénine (TV Mini-Series) – Karenin
2013: Das Jerusalem-Syndrom (TV Movie) – Dr. Uri Peled / Lev Simons
2013: Pinocchio (TV Mini-Series) – Antonio
2014: Bocksprünge – Silvan
2014: Das Lächeln der Frauen (TV Movie) – André Chabanais
2015: One Breath – Jan
2017: Wendy – Gunnar
2018: Luna – Jakob
2018: Wendy 2 – Freundschaft für immer – Gunnar
2019: Tribes of Europa – Jacob

References

External links 

Interview Prisma
Magazin Cinema
Interview with Benjamin Sadler

1971 births
Living people
Alumni of RADA
German male film actors
German male television actors
Canadian people of German descent
Canadian people of English descent
German people of English descent
Male actors from Berlin
Male actors from Toronto